There are numerous islands containing the word holm, mainly in northern Europe. In many cases the name is derived from the Old Norse holmr, meaning "a small and rounded islet". These include:

Denmark
 Bornholm
 Hørsholm
 Munkholm
 Slotsholmen

Germany
 Dänholm
 Holm in Flensburg
 Holm in Schleswig

Greenland
 Holm Ø

Ireland 
Holmpatrick  (the original name for the town of Skerries, and one of its islands, in North Dublin)

Sweden
Stockholm  (originally the islet Helgeandsholmen in central Stockholm)
Djursholm (suburb of Stockholm)
Tureholm
There are hundreds of islets in the Stockholm archipelago containing the word "holm"

United Kingdom

England

Holm Island in the River Thames
Steep Holm in the Bristol Channel

Northern Ireland

Ballynahinch, County Down

Orkney, Scotland

Glimps Holm
Helliar Holm
Holm of Papa
Lamb Holm
Linga Holm
Muckle Green Holm
In the vicinity of Copinsay:
Black Holm
Corn Holm
In the vicinity of Eday:
Rusk Holm
In the vicinity of Egilsay:
Holm of Scockness
Kili Holm
In the vicinity of Gairsay:
Grass Holm, Orkney
Sweyn Holm
In the vicinity of Orkney Mainland:
Holm of Houton
Holm of Rendall
Thieves Holm
In the vicinity of Shapinsay:
Helliar Holm
In the vicinity of Stronsay:
Holm of Huip
In the vicinity of Westray:
Holm of Faray

Shetland, Scotland

In the vicinity of Shetland Mainland:
Dore Holm
Horse Holm
Lady's Holm
Little Holm, Scatness
Burwick Holm
Holm of Culsetter
Fish Holm
Lunna Holm
 North Holm of Barravoe
Setter Holm, Hamnavoe
 South Holm of Burravoe
Wether Holm, Hamnavoe
In the vicinity of East Burra:
Holm of Hous
In the vicinity of Noss:
Holm of Noss.
In the vicinity of Out Skerries:
Wether Holm, Out Skerries
In the vicinity of Papa Stour:
Brei Holm
Forewick Holm
In the vicinity of  Unst:
Brough Holm
In the vicinity of  Uyea, Unst:
Wedder Holm, Uyea
In the vicinity of West Linga:
Kettil Holm
Wether Holm, West Linga
In the vicinity of Yell:
Holm of West Sandwick
Gloup Holm
Little Holm, Yell Sound
Muckle Holm, Yell Sound

Skye, Scotland

East of the Trotternish peninsula:
Holm Island

South Georgia

Grassholm, South Georgia

Wales

Flat Holm in the Bristol Channel
Burry Holms off the Gower Peninsula
Grassholm west of Skomer
Middleholm east of Skomer
Skokholm south of Skomer
Puffin Island, Anglesey, formerly known as Priestholm

Variant forms

Faroe Islands
Baglhólmur
Gáshólmur
Hovshólmur
Hoyvíkshólmur
Kirkjubøhólmur
Lopranshólmur
Mykineshólmur
Sumbiarhólmur
Tindhólmur
Tjaldavíkshólmur
Trøllhøvdi

Iceland 
Stykkishólmur

France, Normandy 
Engohomme in the 11th century, former island on the Seine River at Martot, Eure département
Grand-Couronne, Seine-Maritime
le Houlme, Seine-Maritime
le Hom, Calvados
Robehomme, Calvados
Saint-Quentin-sur-le-Homme, Manche
Île Meuromme, island on the Seine River, at Freneuse, Seine-Maritime
Torhulmus 1030 ancient name of the Oissel island, Seine-Maritime
les Échommes, hamlet at Saint-Senier-sous-Avranches (Eschehoume 1517)
Suhomme, former hamlet at Varaville (Suhomme 1753 - 1785)

Insular Normandy 

Bailiwick of Guernsey

 Off Guernsey
 Les Houmets including - Houmet Benest/Benet, Houmet Paradis & Houmet Hommetol (Omptolle).
 Off Herm
 Le Plat Houmet
 
Bailiwick of Jersey

 Le Plat Hommet
 Le Hommet du Ouaisné
 Les Hommets

See also
-hou, sometimes Norman version of the holmr, found commonly in the Channel Islands and on the Cotentin peninsula
Fore Holm (disambiguation)
Grass Holm (disambiguation)
Little Holm (disambiguation)
Muckle Holm (disambiguation)
Wether Holm (disambiguation)
List of Orkney islands
List of Shetland islands

References
 Haswell-Smith, Hamish (2004) The Scottish Islands. Edinburgh. Canongate. 

Scottish Island set index articles

da:Holm (ø)
de:Holm (Insel)
no:Holme (geografi)
nn:Holme
sv:Holme